Felicity Abram ( Twin - born 16 August 1986 in Brisbane, Queensland) Australian professional triathlete.

Early life and education
Felicity Abram , or more often known as Flick , was born on 16 August 1986 in Brisbane, Queensland, to Louisa and Bill Abram. She spent her early years outside on the family's 20,000-acre estate in Central Queensland.

Later on, she moved to Brisbane to attend Brisbane Girls Grammar School, where she completed most of her schooling , before finishing at St Peters Lutheran College under athletic scholarship in 2003. 

She was an Australian Institute of Sport scholarship holder.

Career
In 2003 , at her very first ITU triathlon debut, Felicity Abram won the Gold medal at the World Junior Championships ahead of Vanessa Fernandes and Maxine Seear in Queenstown , NZ ..  In 2005, at the young age of 18, she was admitted to the Australian National Elite Team and placed a creditable 6th at her first Elite World Championship . Under the coaching of Australian Shaun Stephens , 2006 marked a highlight in her career with a Bronze medal at the World Championship in Lausanne . In 2006 Felicity also got selected for Australia in the Commonwealth Games , Melbourne . In 2008 she was the Number 1 in the ITU World rankings, still the Australian Triathlon federation did not appoint her as a member of the Olympic Team for Beijing. Throughout her career she was selected to represent Australia in 8 Elite World Championships .. Other highlights through her career include multiple Noosa Triathlon podiums & multiple FFTRI podiums under French Tri Team TCG Parthenay . In later half of 2013 she sustained an injury that would never see her return to ITU racing . She formally retired in 2016 , however she does take part in charity events .

ITU competitions 
Felicity started in a total 52 International Triathlon Union races including 12 podiums and 5 wins . The following list is based upon the official ITU rankings and the Athlete's Profile Page. Unless indicated otherwise the following events are triathlons (Olympic Distance) and belong to the Elite category. 

BG = the sponsor British Gas ·

References

External links

 
 
 
 Triathlon Australia Association

Australian female triathletes
Living people
1986 births
Sportswomen from Queensland
Sportspeople from Brisbane
Triathletes at the 2006 Commonwealth Games
Commonwealth Games competitors for Australia